VBS  may refer to:

 Brescia Airport's IATA airport code;
 Vacation Bible School;
 Valley Beth Shalom, a synagogue in Encino, California, US;
 Value breakdown structure in project management;
 .vbs, the file extension for VBScript scripts;
 VBScript, a programming language developed by Microsoft;
 VBS.tv, the broadband video network of Vice magazine;
 Vereinigte Breslauer Sportfreunde, a defunct German football club;
 Vetting and Barring Scheme of the Independent Safeguarding Authority, UK;
 Vividh Bharati Service, an Indian radio channel;
 VBS Mutual Bank, a defunct South African mutual bank;
 Video Baseband Signal, an unmodulated analog B/W video signal used e.g., by the Composite Video standard;
 Virtualization Based Security, a feature of the Microsoft Windows operating system;
 VBS, a military tactical shooter simulation used for dismounted infantry training by the USMC, the US Army, and a number of the NATO armed forces.

See also 

 VB (disambiguation)